Llechog is a top of Garnedd Ugain on the Snowdon massif in Wales. It is the top of a long crest of cliffs that start in Llanberis and finishes on Garnedd Ugain. The nearby Clogwyn Station is a stop of the Snowdon mountain railway. The summit is a rocky peak sitting out from cliffs which fall steeply down to the Nant Peris valley. The viewpoint is commanding, where the full prominence of Glyder Fawr, Y Garn, Elidir Fawr and Crib Goch can be admired.

A second top of the same name can also be found about 1/2 mile to the south-west of Snowdon summit, overlooking Cwm Clogwyn.

References

Llanberis
Mountains and hills of Gwynedd
Mountains and hills of Snowdonia
Hewitts of Wales
Nuttalls